Mohamed Bey Naguib Youssef Qutb El-Qashlan (19 February 1901 – 28 August 1984), also known as Mohamed Naguib, was an Egyptian revolutionary, and, along with Gamal Abdel Nasser, one of the two principal leaders of the Egyptian Revolution of 1952 that toppled the monarchy of Egypt and Sudan, leading to the establishment of the Republic of Egypt, and the independence of Sudan.

A distinguished and decorated general who was wounded in action in the Arab-Israeli War of 1948, he became the leader of the Free Officers Movement of nationalist army officers opposed to the continued presence of British troops in Egypt and Sudan, and the corruption and incompetence of King Farouk. Following the toppling of Farouk in July 1952, Naguib went on to serve as the head of the Revolutionary Command Council, the prime minister, and first president of Egypt, successfully negotiating the independence of Sudan (hitherto a condominium of Egypt and the United Kingdom), and the withdrawal of all British military personnel from Egypt. His tenure as president came to end in November 1954 due to disagreements with other members of the Free Officers, particularly with Nasser, who forced him to resign and succeeded him as president.

Early life and education
Mohamed Naguib was born on 19 February 1901 in Khartoum, Anglo-Egyptian Sudan to Youssef Naguib and Zohra Ahmed Othman. Zohra was from an Egyptian family residing in Sudan, while Youssef was a ranking officer of the Egyptian Armed Forces who had come from a notable Egyptian family of army officers. Naguib was the eldest of nine children.

Naguib attended secondary and military school at Gordon Memorial College in Khartoum, graduating in 1918. He joined the Egyptian Royal Guard in 1923. In 1927, Naguib became the first Egyptian military officer to obtain a law license. In 1929 he earned a postgraduate degree in political economy, and then another postgraduate degree in civil law in 1931.

Military career

In December 1931, Naguib was promoted to the rank of captain. He moved to the border patrol in Arish in 1934. He was part of the military committee that carried out the terms of the Anglo-Egyptian Treaty of 1936. In Khartoum, he founded a newspaper for the Egyptian Armed Forces in 1937, and he was promoted to the rank of major on 6 May 1938.

Naguib tendered his resignation in protest following the Abdeen Palace incident of 1942. Naguib wrote in his autobiography that he had resigned because he had broken his oath of allegiance to the King by failing to prevent the British siege of the palace, but that Abdeen Palace officials thanked him for his actions regardless and refused to accept his resignation.

Naguib subsequently continued his upward trajectory through the hierarchy of the Egyptian military, achieving the rank of lieutenant colonel and the post of regional governor of the Sinai Peninsula in 1944. He took on leadership of the mechanized infantry of the Sinai in 1947, and was promoted to brigadier general in 1948.

Naguib performed outstandingly during the 1948 Arab-Israeli War, where he was wounded seven times. For his service he was awarded the first military star of Fuad as well as the title of Bey. He was also subsequently awarded with the directorship of the Egyptian Military Academy, where he would ultimately encounter the members of the Free Officers Movement.

Free Officers Movement
Mohamed Naguib was first introduced to the Free Officers Movement by Abdel Hakim Amer during his tenure as the director of the Royal Military Academy in Cairo. The Free Officers were a group of nationalist army officers fiercely opposed to the continuing presence of British military personnel in Egypt and Sudan since 1882, and the attendant political role that the United Kingdom had in Egyptian affairs. Additionally, they viewed the Egyptian and Sudanese monarchy as weak, corrupt, and incapable of protecting Egyptian and Sudanese national interests, particularly against the United Kingdom, and the State of Israel. In particular, they held King Farouk responsible for the poor conduct of the war in Palestine in which 78% of the former Mandate for Palestine was lost to the newly proclaimed State of Israel, and some three quarters of Palestine's Muslim and Christian population were variously expelled from the country, or fled into exile. 

The movement had been led originally by Gamal Abdel Nasser, and was composed exclusively of servicemen who were all under 35 years of age and from low-income backgrounds. Nasser, who like Naguib was a veteran of the Arab-Israeli War, felt that the movement needed an older officer from a distinguished military background in order to be taken seriously. The highly respected and nationally famous Naguib was the obvious choice, and he was invited to assume leadership of the movement. While this proved successful in strengthening the Free Officers, it would later cause great friction within the movement, and an eventual power struggle between the elder Naguib and the younger Nasser. Historians have noted that whilst Naguib understood his position and duty as being the movement's bona fide leader, the younger Free Officers saw him as a figurehead who would yield to the collective decision-making of the movement, giving Naguib a more limited, symbolic role.

Revolution of 1952

On 23 July 1952 at about 1 am, the Free Officers launched the revolution with a coup d'état to depose King Farouk. Naguib was immediately appointed as Commander in Chief of the Army in order to keep the loyalty of the Armed Forces firmly behind the Revolution. His celebrated status as a hero of the Arab-Israeli War, along with his jovial personality and elder statesmen demeanor also made him appear as a reassuring figure to the Egyptian public, who had not previously been exposed to Nasser and the other Free Officers.

The Free Officers chose to govern at first via Aly Maher Pasha, a former prime minister who was known for his opposition to the United Kingdom's occupation of Egypt, and its interference in Egyptian affairs. The next evening, Naguib met with British diplomat John Hamilton. During the meeting Hamilton assured Naguib that the British government supported the abdication of King Farouk, that the Churchill government viewed the coup as an internal Egyptian matter, and that the United Kingdom would intervene only if it felt that British lives and property in Egypt were in danger.

The prospect of British intervention on behalf of Farouk was the biggest threat to the Revolution, and Hamilton's message to Naguib gave the Free Officers the reassurance that they needed to follow through with deposing the King. On the morning of 26 July 1952, Maher arrived at the Ras El Tin Palace where Farouk was staying in order to present him with an ultimatum from Naguib: he was to abdicate his throne, and leave Egypt by 6 pm the following day, or the Egyptian troops gathered outside Ras El Tin would storm the palace and arrest him. Farouk agreed to the terms of the ultimatum, and the following day, in the presence of Maher, and the United States Ambassador Jefferson Caffery, boarded the Royal yacht Mahrousa, and left Egypt. In his memoirs, Naguib described how his journey to the dock to meet the deposed Farouk before the former King departed the country was delayed by throngs of people celebrating the Revolution. Caffery confirmed that Naguib was angry at missing the former King's departure. Upon arrival at the dock, Naguib immediately took sail in a small vessel to meet Farouk on the Mahrousa, and formally bid him farewell.

In September, Naguib was appointed prime minister, and a member of the Royal Regent Council, with Nasser serving as the minister of interior. Farouk's infant son succeeded him as Fuad II, and would be the last King of Egypt. The succession was designed to deny the United Kingdom a pretext for intervention, allowing the revolutionaries to maintain that they were opposed only to the corrupt regime of Farouk, and not to the monarchy itself. However, after consolidating their power, the Free Officers quickly moved to implement their long-held plans for abolishing the monarchy. Ali Maher's government resigned on 7 September 1952, and Naguib was appointed prime minister. On 18 June 1953, almost 11 months after the revolution, the revolutionaries stripped the infant King Fuad II of his title, declared the end of the Kingdom of Egypt and the establishment of the Republic of Egypt.

Presidency

With the declaration of the Republic, Naguib was sworn in as its first President. Owing to the non-Egyptian ancestry of Muhammad Ali Pasha (the progenitor of the Muhammad Ali dynasty), and the earlier dynasties that had governed Egypt, Naguib was referenced in Western media as being the first native Egyptian ruler of Egypt since the Roman conquest of Egypt, or even earlier to Pharaoh Nectanebo II, whose reign ended in 342 BC. Naguib himself objected to this characterisation, stating:"It has been said in the foreign press that I am the first Egyptian to govern Egypt since Cleopatra. Such words flatter but they do not align with our knowledge of our own history. For the sake of glorifying our own Blessed Movement, are we to say that the Fatimads were never Egyptian despite their centuries in Egypt? Do we now deny our kinship with the Ayyubids because of their origin even as we join Saladin's eagle with the Liberation Flag as the symbol of our Revolution? And what of the members of the Mohammed Ali dynasty? Should our grievances against the former King and the flawed and corrupt rulers before him blind us to the nationalism of Abbas Hilmi II, whose devotion to Egypt against the occupiers cost him his throne, or the achievements of Ibrahim Pasha, the very best of the dynasty, who himself declared that the Sun of Egypt and the water of the Nile had made him Egyptian? Are we now to go through the family histories of all Egyptians and invalidate those born to a non-Egyptian parent? If so, I must start with myself. It is fairer and more accurate to say that we are all Egyptians, but I am the first Egyptian to have been raised from the ranks of the people to the highest office to govern Egypt as one of their own. It is an honour and a sacred burden great enough without the embellishments that foreign observers would add to it."

Forced resignation
When Naguib began showing signs of independence from Nasser by distancing himself from the RCC's land reform decrees and drawing closer to Egypt's established political forces, namely the Wafd and the Muslim Brotherhood, Nasser resolved to depose him. In late 1953, Nasser accused Naguib of supporting the recently outlawed Muslim Brotherhood and of harboring dictatorial ambitions. A brief power struggle broke out between Naguib and Nasser for control of the military and of Egypt. Nasser ultimately won the struggle and managed to force Naguib to resign from the presidency of Egypt in November 1954. Nasser then placed Naguib under informal house arrest in a suburban Cairo villa owned by Zeinab Al-Wakil, the wife of former Prime Minister Mostafa El-Nahas. Naguib was released from house arrest in 1971 by President Anwar Sadat.

Personal life and death

Naguib was married and had four children, three sons and a daughter. His sons were Farouk, Yusuf and Ali. Life magazine reported shortly after the revolution in August 1952 that his eldest son Farouk, who was 14 years old, was planning to change his name. His daughter died in 1951.

On 28 August 1984, Naguib died from liver cirrhosis in Cairo, Egypt. He was 83. Naguib had a military funeral that was attended by President Hosni Mubarak.

Legacy
Shortly before his death in 1984, Naguib published his memoirs under the title I Was a President of Egypt. The book was widely circulated and was also translated into English under the title Egypt's Destiny. A station of the Cairo Metro is named in his honor. A major road in the Al Amarat District of Khartoum is also named after him.

In December 2013, Interim Egyptian President Adly Mansour posthumously awarded Naguib the Order of the Nile, the highest honor of the Egyptian state. The award was received by his son, Mohamed Yusuf.

See also
 List of rulers of Egypt

References

Citations

Sources 
 Thornhill, Michael. (September 2004). "Britain, the United States and the Rise of an Egyptian Leader: The Politics and Diplomacy of Nasser's Consolidation of Power, 1952–4". The English Historical Review 119 (483):892–921.
 Aburish, Said K. (2004), Nasser, the Last Arab, New York City: St. Martin's Press, ISBN 978-0-312-28683-5.
 Kandil, Hazem (2012), Soldiers, Spies and Statesmen: Egypt's Road to Revolt, Brooklyn: Verso Books, ISBN 978-1-844467-962-1.

Further reading
 Mohammed Naguib (w/uncredited Leigh White), Egypt's Destiny (London, 1955)

External links
 The forgotten President
 

1901 births
1984 deaths
20th-century presidents of Egypt
20th-century prime ministers of Egypt
Egyptian generals
Egyptian revolutionaries
Egyptian nationalists
Free Officers Movement (Egypt)
Leaders who took power by coup
Egyptian people of Sudanese descent
Politicians from Cairo
People from Khartoum
Naguib family
Deaths from cirrhosis
Egyptian people of the 1948 Arab–Israeli War